Edward Leslie "Les" Meade (4 November 1904 – 9 November 1989) was an Australian rules footballer who played with Melbourne and Hawthorn in the Victorian Football League (VFL).		
		
Born in Terang, Les Meade was the third child of Edward Meade and Emily Elizabeth Ayres. He joined Melbourne from Yarraville at the start of the 1927 VFL season.

Les Meade married Vivienne Alexandra Johnson Maxwell in 1931 and they lived in Glen Iris for over forty years. He also served in the Royal Australian Naval Reserve in World War II. He died in 1989.

Notes

External links 
		
Demonwiki profile

1904 births
1989 deaths
Australian rules footballers from Victoria (Australia)
Melbourne Football Club players
Hawthorn Football Club players
Yarraville Football Club players
Australian military personnel of World War II
Military personnel from Victoria (Australia)